Tsvetko Petrov Boboshevski (Bulgarian: Цвятко Петров Бобошевски) was Regent of Bulgaria for the underage Simeon II from 1944 to 1946. The first name is also transliterated as Tsvyatko.

References

External links 

 
 

Bulgarian politicians
Regents of Bulgaria
1884 births
1952 deaths